Sameodes polythiptalis is a moth in the family Crambidae. It is found in Indonesia (Irian Jaya).

References

Moths described in 1899
Spilomelinae